The 1876 Louisiana gubernatorial election was the third and final election to take place under the Louisiana Constitution of 1868. As a result of this election Francis T. Nicholls became Governor of Louisiana, but not before the election was contested by his opponent. The results of this election, like those of 1872, were disputed. The dispute was resolved by the Compromise of 1877 which gave the Governor's Mansion to Democrat Francis T. Nicholls. The Compromise also gave Republican presidential candidate Rutherford B. Hayes the electoral votes of several disputed states, including Louisiana, which resulted in his election to the White House. The election of Nicholls marked the end of Reconstruction in Louisiana and the decline of the Republican Party of Louisiana.

Results
Popular Vote

References

1876
Gubernatorial
Louisiana
November 1876 events